Dario José dos Santos (born 4 March 1946), nicknamed Dario or Dadá Maravilha (Wonder Dadá), is a Brazilian former footballer who played as a centre-forward.

Career
Born into poverty, Dadá began his career in 1965, playing in the youth squad of Campo Grande, a small and modest club with no great history in Rio. His style and talent caught the eye of a scout working for Atlético Mineiro, a large and very traditional club from the state of Minas Gerais, who signed him in 1968. In 1969 his prestige was so great that then Brazilian President Emílio Garrastazu Médici asked coach Mário Zagallo to call Dadá to join the national team going to the 1970 World Cup in Mexico. He was benched for most of the tournament, however. In total he was capped 6 times for Brazil between 1970 and 1973.

In 1971, Dadá helped Atlético win its first Campeonato Brasileiro title, scoring the only goal in the final match against Botafogo. He played for Atlético until 1973, when he transferred over to Flamengo. After another brief stint with Atlético, he played for Sport Club do Recife in the 1974–75 season, where he helped the team win the Pernambuco state championship. In April 1976 he scored 10 goals in a game against Santos Amaro (14–0), a record for the Brazilian football in official matches (previous one held by Pelé).

In 1976, he was signed by Internacional de Porto Alegre for what was, at the time, one of the biggest transactions in Brazilian football. In contrast to great players in the Internacional roster at the time, such as Figueroa, Falcão, Pablo Cesar and Valdomiro, Dadá was perceived as clumsy and slow, but his great positioning and finishing made him one of the greatest strikers in the history of the club. He was the top scorer of the 1976 Brazilian Championship, scoring 16 goals for Internacional, including the first goal in the final match against Corinthians, which Internacional won 2–0.

He signed with Ponte Preta in 1977 but sat out for most of the year while recovering from pneumonia. He returned to Atlético Mineiro for the 1978–1979 season, but wasn't as successful. From 1979 to 1986, he played for several different teams of less prestige like Náutico, Santa Cruz, Bahia and Goiás, finally ending his career at Comercial Esporte Clube, a club from Registro, in São Paulo state.

Throughout his career, his talent for scoring goals and sympathy with the fans earned him many nicknames, including "Dario Peito-de-aço" (Iron Chest Dario), "Rei Dadá" (King Dadá) and "Dadá Beija-Flor" (Dadá the Hummingbird), the latter a reference to his great impulse, which made him seemingly stop in mid-air. Dada's pre-match declarations were much sought after by sport beat reporters as he had the flair of coining names to goals yet to be scored by himself on any given match. He is also notorious for having coined many catch phrases which are still remembered and used by many Brazilian fans, such as "There's no such thing as an ugly goal, what's ugly is not scoring".

Honours

Club 
Atlético Mineiro
Campeonato Mineiro: 1970, 1978
Campeonato Brasileiro Série A: 1971

Sport
Campeonato Pernambucano: 1975

Internacional
Campeonato Gaúcho: 1976
Campeonato Brasileiro Série A: 1976

Bahia
Campeonato Baiano: 1981

Goiás
Campeonato Goiano: 1983

International 
Brazil
FIFA World Cup: 1970

References

1943 births
Living people
Footballers from Rio de Janeiro (city)
Brazilian footballers
Campeonato Brasileiro Série A players
1970 FIFA World Cup players
FIFA World Cup-winning players
Brazil international footballers
Association football forwards
Campo Grande Atlético Clube players
Clube Atlético Mineiro players
CR Flamengo footballers
Sport Club do Recife players
Sport Club Internacional players
Associação Atlética Ponte Preta players
Paysandu Sport Club players
Clube Náutico Capibaribe players
Santa Cruz Futebol Clube players
Esporte Clube Bahia players
Goiás Esporte Clube players
Coritiba Foot Ball Club players
Atlético Rio Negro Clube players
Nacional Futebol Clube players
Esporte Clube XV de Novembro (Piracicaba) players